The 1886 Melbourne Cup was a two-mile handicap horse race which took place on Tuesday, 2 November 1886.

This year was the twenty-sixth running of the Melbourne Cup.

This is the list of placegetters for the 1886 Melbourne Cup.

See also

 Melbourne Cup
 List of Melbourne Cup winners
 Victoria Racing Club

References

External links
1886 Melbourne Cup footyjumpers.com

1886
Melbourne Cup
Melbourne Cup
19th century in Melbourne
1880s in Melbourne